The Waldo water tower, officially called the Frank T. Riley Memorial, is a white, castle-like tower in the Waldo neighborhood of south Kansas City, Missouri, United States.

Description

The structure was a functioning water tower from 1920 until 1957. The tower was pictured each year from 1929 to 1946 in the World Book Encyclopedia as an early example of reinforced concrete. It was listed in 1975 as Missouri's first American Water Landmark by the American Water Works Association, and is on the National Register of Historic Places.

The tower is topped by crenellations and 12 arched windows. It was constructed using a 14-day continuous pour.

In August 1962, the remains of a 20-year-old man missing since the previous November were discovered in the bottom of the tower. To retrieve the body, a hole was created near the bottom of the tower. The location of that hole is still visible on the west side of the tower. The tower is currently protected from vandals and climbers by a chain-link fence topped with barbed wire.

In 2015, the Kansas City Council set aside $850,000 to renovate the tower.

See also

 National Register of Historic Places listings in Kansas City, Missouri

References

External links

 National Register of Historic Places nomination form for the tower (PDF) from the Missouri Department of Natural Resources website
 Historic Tower Park, published by the Tower Homes Association, a Waldo community organization named for the tower
 Tower Park, from the Kansas City, Missouri website
 Waldo Tower Historic Society, a 501(c)(3) registered nonprofit organization founded to foster public awareness and focus efforts to rehabilitate and preserve the tower

Infrastructure completed in 1919
Towers completed in 1919
Buildings and structures in Kansas City, Missouri
Water towers in Missouri
Water towers on the National Register of Historic Places in Missouri
National Register of Historic Places in Kansas City, Missouri